Cohors I Ubiorum was a Roman auxiliary cohort. The cohort was at one point or another stationed at Calidava/Calidaua (modern day Capidava in Romania).

See also 
 Roman auxiliaries
 List of Roman auxiliary regiments

Military of ancient Rome